Dorota Bielska (born 4 September 1961) is a Polish field hockey player. She competed in the women's tournament at the 1980 Summer Olympics.

References

External links
 

1961 births
Living people
Polish female field hockey players
Olympic field hockey players of Poland
Field hockey players at the 1980 Summer Olympics
Sportspeople from Wrocław